Sage, also known as Tessa, is a character appearing in American comic books published by Marvel Comics. She has most often been associated with the X-Men and the Hellfire Club, whom she spied upon for Professor Charles Xavier.

A mutant, Sage possesses a number of mental abilities and was originally presented as the personal assistant to the Hellfire Club's Sebastian Shaw, but an extended retcon revealed that she was one of the first mutants discovered by Professor Xavier. She has been a member of the original X-Men teams, Excalibur, the Exiles, and a cross-dimensional X-Men team similar to the Exiles known as the X-Treme X-Men. Sage appears in the television series The Gifted played by Hayley Lovitt.

Publication history

Tessa first appeared in The Uncanny X-Men #132 (April 1980), and was created by Chris Claremont and John Byrne. Initially an agent of the Hellfire Club, decades later, she would join the X-Men and adopt the code-name "Sage" in X-Men #109 (February 2001). An extended retcon carried out by Claremont in X-Treme X-Men between 2002 and 2004 would later reveal that she had always been working for Professor X, serving as a spy for him within the Hellfire Club.

The character is carried over to Uncanny X-Men during the Reload phase (2004), beginning with issue #444, but leaves the team in issue #455. She later reappears in New Excalibur (2005-2007) #1-24, mini-series X-Men: Die by the Sword (2007-2008) #1-5, Exiles (vol. 2) #100, New Exiles (2008-2009) #1-18 and a cameo in Exiles (vol. 3) #6.

She returns to the fray in X-Treme X-Men (vol. 2) (2012-2013) #6-13, and years later in Uncanny X-Men (vol. 5) (2018) #10, House of X (mini-series) (2019) #1 and X-Force (vol. 6) #1-present.

Fictional character biography
Sage's exact country of origin remains unrevealed, but she claims to have come from a war-torn region. By the time she reaches young adulthood, she is living by herself in Afghanistan. Although she tries to keep out of the conflicts between the rebels and the government, she is willing to use her guns and other weapons on anything that poses a threat. One day, she hears a call from a cave which is considered haunted by the locals. The voice (in her head) guides her deeper into the cavern, where she finds Charles Xavier, who is trapped underneath a pile of debris. His legs have been crushed during his battle with the alien Lucifer. Xavier senses that Sage is a mutant, and explains the meaning of her abilities. Although Sage says that this was about the same time he located Beast; in other accounts he found Sage first.

Sage helps Xavier and tries to get him to a hospital, but during their journey down the mountain, they come across a United Nations relief convoy under attack by robbers, who have raped and killed the UN workers. Sage exacts revenge on their behalf and kills the robbers, though she later despises herself for being so brutal.

Hellfire Club
Years later, Sage meets up again with Xavier, who at the time is recruiting the original X-Men. Instead of being chosen for the first X-Men class, she is sent to spy on the Hellfire Club as Tessa, and to keep watch on Sebastian Shaw, something which returns to haunt her in the following years.

While working at the Hellfire Club she encounters Psylocke, Jean Grey, and Emma Frost, who at this point is the White Queen. While she is able to successfully warn Psylocke away from the Hellfire Club, Tessa is later remorseful that she is unable to similarly prevent the corruption of Phoenix into the Black Queen. This transformation is a key factor in the creation of Dark Phoenix.

Sometime during Tessa's time with the Hellfire Club, Sebastian Shaw and Emma Frost dare the man known as Elias Bogan to wager in a game of poker. Though he holds no official rank in the Inner Circle, the telepathic Bogan is one of the club's most important and powerful members; his patronage guarantees success in the organization. By the terms of the wager, if Shaw lost, Frost would "belong" to Bogan, but if Bogan's agent lost, then his fortune would be turned over to Shaw. Thanks to Tessa's advice and analytical skills, Bogan loses the game and is forced to honor the wager. Having never lost before, Bogan harbors a grudge against Tessa.

During the X-Men's initial conflicts with the Hellfire Club, Tessa primarily maintains a background role and is seen as only Shaw's unusually intelligent assistant. Hints of her more complex role are indicated when she and Xavier are kidnapped by Donald Pierce, a renegade member of the club, with grudges against both organizations. Based on the interactions between Xavier and Tessa, it is unclear whether he is helping to maintain her cover or whether he feels as if he has lost his agent, since the interaction between the two is kept impersonal. The two are rescued by the nascent team of New Mutants, and Tessa takes Pierce into custody on behalf of the Hellfire Club.

Tessa's next notable interaction with Xavier's students happens months later when the X-Men and Hellfire Club are hunting down Rachel Summers after her attempted murder of Selene, the newly installed Black Queen. In the middle of their fight, both teams are taken by surprise by Nimrod, a mutant-hunting robot from the future. Recognizing the more immediate threat, the two groups join forces and are able to severely damage Nimrod. The X-Men and Hellfire Club each sustain heavy losses and are forced to flee the scene quickly. Tessa offers Storm and the X-Men temporary sanctuary with the club, which later results in Magneto and Storm jointly accepting the role of White King in the Inner Circle.

After the Hellfire Club
Magneto becomes more actively involved with the Hellfire Club after the X-Men's supposed death in Dallas at the climax of the Fall of the Mutants. Tensions between Magneto and Sebastian Shaw grow until, finally, Magneto ousts Shaw from the group. Although Tessa remains with the Hellfire Club after his departure, her role diminishes. Shortly thereafter, the Upstarts begin to hunt down mutant leaders, starting with former and current leaders of the Inner Circle. Shinobi Shaw seemingly murders his father, Sebastian; Emma Frost is put into a coma. Tessa continues to serve as Shinobi's assistant, much as she had his father, and she also begins to use her telepathic skills more openly. After Tessa prevents Shinobi from solidifying his hold on the Hellfire Club, however, the younger Shaw ceases to work with her.

Sebastian Shaw returns after a period of recuperation with the extradimensional Holocaust at his side. Seeking assistance in controlling this powerful mutant, Shaw calls Tessa back into his service. Her minor telepathic abilities are able to keep him in check since most telepaths in his native reality had been killed and he had not developed psychic defenses. The two lose Holocaust, though, when Onslaught decides he needs that mutant for his own purposes. Selene and her new amnesiac thrall Madelyne Pryor join with Shaw to regain their roles in the Hellfire Club. Suspicious of Pryor, Tessa attempts to telepathically probe her while she is sleeping, unwittingly reawakening Madelyne's memories of her tragic life and first death with the X-Men. Tessa is quickly overwhelmed and nearly killed. The only thing that stays Madelyne's hand is that Tessa's murder would have caused unnecessary complications. Instead, Pryor merely removes all memory of the conflict.

Six-month gap
Although it had been years since Tessa had outwitted him, Bogan kidnaps Sage and mentally dominates her. This possession permanently scars her mind. Bogan offers Tessa back to Shaw for everything he has. Shaw refuses and cuts his ties with Tessa. However, the X-Men become aware of Tessa's predicament, and Storm is able to rescue her.

Out of gratitude, she stays with the X-Men, primarily in a support capacity, and resumes use of the name Sage. Fearful of mental domination by Bogan or another powerful telepath, Sage relinquished the use of her telepathic power and focused her force of will to maintain her mental shields. With the X-Men, Sage acts as a living computer, able to remember everything she sees and hears, and provide analysis.

X-Treme X-Men
After the X-Men learn of Destiny's prophetic diaries, the Books of Truth, Storm forms a splinter group that leaves the X-Mansion to hunt down the missing volumes. Sage is one of her first recruits. While the X-Treme team primarily makes use of her analytical skills, her mutant power to "jump-start" other mutants' abilities is used in a few critical junctures: saving the Beast's life by mutating him into a more animalistic, feline form; allowing Rogue temporary access and control of all powers she had ever absorbed; restoring Gambit's powers after injuries had overloaded them, and unlocking Slipstream's latent teleportation powers. During this period she forms a strong working relationship with Bishop in solving cases, most notably when the two briefly return to the X-Mansion to help investigate the attempted murder of Emma Frost.

After the prophecies of the diaries are determined to be (apparently) invalid, the group still remains separate from the main team of X-Men due to differences in philosophy with Xavier. Storm petitions various world governments for official recognition as a mutant unit for policing mutant activity. Granted this authority, her unit is dubbed the X-Treme Sanctions Executive (X.S.E), and Sage becomes an officer of this unit. Although initially more mobile, the X.S.E. eventually returns to the X-Mansion as its base of operations. Sage's tenure with the team is abruptly ended when she rejoins the Hellfire Club to keep an eye on Sunspot (who has become the new Lord Imperial) to make sure he is not corrupted by power as Sebastian was.

New Excalibur

For reasons yet unknown, Sage leaves Sunspot's side and travels to England to join forces with the newly reformed New Excalibur. She helps them on various missions such as battling the Shadow King, and returning to ancient Camelot to prevent it from being prematurely destroyed. In a more subtle use of her observation abilities, Sage is instrumental in her teammate Nocturne's recovery from a debilitating stroke.

To learn more about a mysterious new foe, Albion, and thwart his attempt to conquer Britain, Sage creates the new cover identity and persona of Diana Fox. This persona appears to be fully devoted to Albion and his goals. However, this bothers her teammate Wisdom as he fears she might fail the mission, similar to her time with the Hellfire Club. Her Diana Fox persona climbs up the rank of Albion's Shadow Captains as Britannia, and develops a rivalry with Lionheart. Like the rest of Albion's army, Sage is given a suit that emphasizes loyalty to him, as well as equipping her with flight and superhuman physical strength. Although she has the opportunity to kill Albion, one purpose of her infiltration, she is struck by an errant pulse from an ancient item used by Albion to extinguish power in England. Though Lionheart suspects her betrayal, Albion believes she was only trying to protect him.

Wisdom's fears are realized after this when the Diana Fox persona takes complete control and Sage becomes fully committed to Albion's side. During this time, she slays two of New Excalibur's former allies in Shadow-X, Dark Cyclops and Dark Beast. A direct confrontation with her teammates in New Excalibur helps reassert Sage's original personality. Together with New Excalibur, Shadow-X, and now Lionheart, Sage defeats Albion and his Shadow Captains.

X-Men: Die by the Sword and New Exiles
Immediately after the defeat of the Shadow Captains, a party is held in honor of Excalibur.  While the team enjoys the party, Sage feels guilt for her actions.  The party is suddenly crashed by members of the Exiles; Psylocke and a Thunderbird from an alternate universe.  They are then attacked by Rouge-Mort and drawn into a battle for the safety of the Multiverse from a psychotic Merlin and The Fury.  They join forces with the rest of the Exiles, Roma and the Captain Britain Corps. The team defeats Merlin, but not before he manages to kill Roma.

Prior to her death, Roma manages to transfer all of her knowledge about the Multiverse into Sage's mind, causing her to become overwhelmed; she fears for her sanity. Fearful of what would happen if someone on Earth ever gained the knowledge in her mind, Sage joins the Exiles. She suffers from hallucinations mixing her own memories with the information passed to her by Roma; furthermore, the Diana Fox persona re-emerges and attempts to take control once again.

While the other Exiles go on missions, Sage largely remains at their base of operation, fighting the effects of Roma's memories and Diana Fox tenaciously every day until she drops from exhaustion. She refuses to lose possession of her mind, body, and soul. For a while she manages to calm down the phantoms, however, Diana Fox remains an aggressive presence in Sage's mind, fighting her for control.

While diverting her focus to analyze Cat's uncontrolled ability to "cascade" through different alternate versions of herself, and Cat's empathic connection to the Crystal Palace, the phantoms in Sage's mind break free from their mental prison. Sage decides to confront them and Diana once and for all. During her struggle, she bonds with Cat, who had been trying to find a way to heal the dying Multiverse. Sage tells Cat that she is probably too close to the situation and that it is time for a fresh mind and a new perspective. She sends Cat away to join the rest of the team and prepares to find answers, just as Diana Fox shows up, wanting to fight.

Sage and Diana fight each other but neither is yielding; they are too evenly matched and equally stubborn. As long as they fight each other, they cannot defeat the phantoms. The women decide to team up against a greater threat: the return of Merlin. During battles, Sage and Diana get a better understanding of each other and their motives.

Merlin almost kills Sage. Knowing that she could never find answers to the collapsing of the Multiverse like Sage could, Diana decides to sacrifice herself to revive Sage for the greater good. Sage reabsorbs Diana and destroys the evil version of Merlin. Sage then follows her instincts and merges with the Crystal Palace, an act which stabilizes the Multiverse. This fate was intended for Cat, but being too young and too scared, she was unable to handle it. From then on, when the New Exiles communicate with the Crystal Palace, they do not address a computer, they speak to a living being: Sage. Sage was seen once more in the Crystal Palace. However she seems to have been permanently absorbed and rendered comatose along with her Exiles team.

Return to X-Treme X-Men
Like Sabretooth, she was apparently rescued, revived, or separated, as she was later seen helping Dazzler and an alternative reality Wolverine rescue a kid version of Nightcrawler from the robots of yet another alternative reality. As of the conclusion of the "X-Termination" storyline Sage returned to Earth-616.

Return to the X-Men and Krakoa
In 2018, Sage cameos in the 10-part storyline X-Men Disassembled when Jean Grey contacts several telepaths to defeat an empowered X-Man (Nate Grey). In mid- to late-2019, she guest stars in the dual mini-series House of X and Powers of X, written by Jonathan Hickman. In the new status quo for the X-titles, Dawn of X, the character is part of the cast of the X-Force relaunch (2019), and has cameos in other contemporary titles. In Krakoa, she works with Doug Ramsey to establish the Krakoa transit system to allow mutants to arrive at the island.

Powers and abilities
Sage is a mutant whose mind works in the same way as a supercomputer. Her mind has unlimited storage capacity, and she is able to immediately recall any information she has stored with perfect clarity. The speed of her thoughts allows her to analyze her surroundings for information in an instant, and track the probability of an event by piecing together stored and acquired data. She is able to perform multiple functions at once by allocating a portion of her brain to each task: Sage can replay a movie she has seen in her mind, play a game of internet chess, and focus on battling an opponent simultaneously without any one task distracting her from another. Sage's control of her mind gives her total control of her own body. She is able to perfectly recreate physical actions that she has seen once (so long as they are within her physical parameters), and she can control her bodily functions to a degree, like stopping her heart or breathing for as long as is safe.

Sage is also able to 'see' a person's genetic code, reading their DNA sequences for latent and manifested mutations. This allows her to identify mutants, and understand how their powers work more thoroughly than they themselves do. Sage is able to selectively evolve existing genetic traits, as well as catalyze the untapped genetic potential of latent mutants. Once begun, the procedure is irreversible and can often result in unpredictable side effects.

Sage possesses a degree of telepathic ability, allowing her to communicate with others over short distances, project psionic energy blasts, create illusions, and release an astral form within a limited range. By shutting down her telepathy, she is able to create a psychic firewall that blocks all manner of mental intrusion. The firewall can be used to deflect a psychic attack back at its source.

Sage is skilled in the martial arts, and is formidable hand-to-hand combatant thanks to her having complete conscious control over her own body. Her analytical skills and facility with probability also extend to combat situations, allowing her to predict an opponent's attacks and initiate the optimal counter-attack. Sage is also self-taught in a wide range of firearms, which she can use with considerable skill and accuracy. Her computer-like mind makes it easy for her to learn new skills and languages.

During her merge with the Exiles' home, the ancient Panoptichron (also known as the "Crystal Palace") Sage gained access to all of its functions. She could project her image as a hologram, as well as a solid body. She possessed awareness to the Palace's environment, and could teleport objects and living beings from any Earth in the Multiverse.

Equipment
 Sage uses a pair of cybernetic sunglasses that allow her to access and interface with computers and data networks.
 She frequently carries and uses firearms and edged weapons, and is highly skilled in their use. Her firearms are sometimes loaded with stun ammunition.

Reception
 In 2014, Entertainment Weekly ranked Sage 60th in their "Let's rank every X-Man ever" list.

Other versions

Mangaverse
In X-Men Ronin, Tessa is part of the Hellfire Club, the daughter of Professor X, and Emma Frost's sister.

What If?
In the What If special, "What if.. Magneto and Professor X had formed the X-Men together?" an alternate version of Sage was depicted.

In an alternative world where Professor Xavier and Magneto's ways did not part, Sage was found by both men and was never sent to spy on Sebastian Shaw in the Hellfire Club. As a result, Sage never helped that world's Shaw win his bet with Bogan, and Shaw lost Emma Frost to Bogan. Since Xavier had Sage around to find other mutants for him, he never developed his mutant-tracking computer, Cerebro.

When Xavier finally began developing Cerebro, he used Sage to beta test it, comparing the readings of the device to the readings achieved with Sage's own mutant power. In this timeline, Sage served as Professor Xavier's Executive Assistant.

New X-Men
In the second volume of New X-Men, an alternate future is shown where Prodigy retains the knowledge he telepathically absorbs; Sage is shown to be Prodigy's secretary. She is responsible for convincing Jeffrey Garrett to destroy China and the death of Jay Guthrie in this alternate timeline.

X-Men: The End
In the alternate future presented in the X-Men: The End series of books. X-23, M, and Iceman are sent to Hong Kong to locate and capture the renegade X.S.E. member, Sage. However, Sage uses her considerable espionage skills to ambush X-23, attaching Malice's choker to her neck that temporarily overwhelms X-23. Sage has been using the choker to gather as much information from as many people as she can in hopes that she will eventually have access to all of the knowledge/information in the world.  Sage removes the choker and attempts to flee just as Iceman arrives and freezes her, allowing the group to safely take her into custody.

In other media
 Sage appears in the novelization for X-Men: The Last Stand as a student of Xavier's School for Gifted Youngsters.
 Sage appears in The Gifted, portrayed by Hayley Lovitt. This version was homeless before joining the Mutant Underground. After losing faith in them, she joins the Hellfire Club to combat Trask Industries' Hound program, but is killed by Reeva Payge.

Notes

References

External links
 Detailed biography on Sage at UncannyXmen.net
 Sage the living computer – Sage fansite (archived)
 Cyberpaths  – Sage forums

Characters created by Chris Claremont
Characters created by John Byrne (comics)
Comics characters introduced in 1980
Fictional characters with eidetic memory
Fictional characters with energy-manipulation abilities
Fictional mercenaries in comics
Fictional secret agents and spies in comics
Marvel Comics characters who have mental powers
Marvel Comics martial artists
Marvel Comics mutants
Marvel Comics telepaths
Marvel Comics female superheroes
X-Men supporting characters